Riccardo Brosco (born 3 February 1991) is an Italian footballer who plays as a defender for  club Pescara.

Club career
Brosco is a product of the Roma youth system. His favoured position is at centre back but he is also able to score goals with his good heading ability. At the age of 17 he became a key member of Roma's U20 side that finished as runners-up in the U20 cup tournament. He has captained the youth side on many occasions.

Brosco was on Roma's bench in several games in the 2008–09 season.

Triestina
Brosco was loaned out to Serie B club Triestina on 5 August 2009 and got his senior debut in a Coppa Italia match on 16 August 2009. His league debut came five days later in a scoreless draw against Mantova. In June 2010 Triestina excised the option to sign him in co-ownership deal for €100,000. In June 2011 Triestina acquired the remain 50% registration rights for €500.

Pescara
In the summer of 2011, he was bought by Parma for €200,000, which decided to send him to Serie B club Pescara in another co-ownership deal for €100,000. On 10 September 2011, he made his debut with Pescara in the home match won 2–0 against Crotone.

He moved on loan to fellow Serie B club Ternana on 31 August 2012, along with Riccardo Maniero and Antonino Ragusa. In June 2013 Parma bought back Brosco for €500.

Latina
Brosco returned to Parma in June 2013. In July 2013 Brosco was signed by another Serie B club Latina in temporary deal, along with Alessandro Iacobucci. In June 2014 Latina did not excised the option to purchase both players; however on 10 July 2014 Brosco was signed by Latina in 4-year contract.

Verona
On 31 January 2017, he was sold to Verona. Verona loaned him back to Latina until the end of the 2016–17 season.

Ascoli
On 24 July 2018, Brosco signed with Ascoli.

Vicenza
On 20 July 2021, he signed a two-year contract with Vicenza.

Return to Pescara
On 30 August 2022, Brosco returned to Pescara, now in Serie C.

International career
In August 2009, Brosco was called up for Italy's U-21 squad as a replacement for the injured Tuia. With the Italy U-19 squad he took part at the 2010 U-19 European Championship.

On 17 November 2010 he made his debut with the Italy U-21 team in a friendly match against Turkey.

References

External links
 Pescara Calcio profile
 

1991 births
Living people
Footballers from Rome
Italian footballers
Association football central defenders
Serie A players
Serie B players
Serie C players
A.S. Roma players
U.S. Triestina Calcio 1918 players
Delfino Pescara 1936 players
Ternana Calcio players
Latina Calcio 1932 players
Hellas Verona F.C. players
A.C. Carpi players
Ascoli Calcio 1898 F.C. players
L.R. Vicenza players
Italy youth international footballers
Italy under-21 international footballers